Kusum Devi Sunderlal Dugar Jain Dental College and Hospital is a private dental college located in Kolkata, in the Indian state of West Bengal. It is affiliated with the West Bengal University of Health Sciences and is recognized by Dental Council of India. It offers Bachelor of Dental Science (BDS) and Master of Dental Science (MDS) courses.

References

Dental colleges in India
Universities and colleges in Kolkata
Affiliates of West Bengal University of Health Sciences
2017 establishments in West Bengal